Tom Beetham was an English professional rugby league footballer who played as a hooker for Wigan between 1924 and 1931. He also played for Cumberland at representative level.

Playing career
Born in Ambleside, Cumberland, Beetham started his career playing rugby union in his hometown before signing for Wigan in 1924. He made his début in September 1924 against York. He spent seven years at Wigan, playing 262 first team games for the club and scoring 10 tries before signing for Barrow in 1931.

Championship final appearances
Tom Beetham played right-, i.e. number 10, in Wigan's 22-10 victory over Warrington in the Championship Final during the 1925–26 season at Knowsley Road, St. Helens on Saturday 8 May 1926.

Challenge Cup Final appearances
Tom Beetham played right-, i.e. number 10, in Wigan's 13-2 victory over Dewsbury in the 1928–29 Challenge Cup Final at Wembley Stadium, London on Saturday 4 May 1929.

County Cup Final appearances
Tom Beetham played left-, i.e. number 8, in Wigan's 5-4 victory over Widnes in the 1928–29 Lancashire County Cup Final during the 1928–29 season at Wilderspool Stadium, Warrington on Saturday 24 November 1928.

Honours

Club
Wigan

Championship (1): 1925–26

Lancashire County League (1): 1925–26

Lancashire County Cup (1): 1928

Challenge Cup (1): 1929

References

Barrow Raiders players
Cumbria rugby league team players
English rugby league players
English rugby union players
Leigh Leopards players
People from Ambleside
Rugby league hookers
Rugby league players from Cumbria
Wigan Warriors players
Year of birth missing
Year of death missing